Bernard Wagenaar (July 18, 1894 – May 19, 1971) was a Dutch-American composer, conductor and violinist.

Wagenaar was born in Arnhem. He studied at Utrecht University before starting his career as a teacher and conductor in 1914. He moved to the U.S. in 1920, and he became a citizen in 1927. From 1925 to 1968 he taught at the Juilliard School, where Ned Rorem, Jacob Druckman, Bernard Herrmann, Robert Ward, Tutti Camarata, Charles Jones, Alan Shulman, Katharine Mulky Warne, and James Cohn were among his pupils. He was an active member of the League of Composers and similar organizations and was an officer of the Order of Orange-Nassau in the Netherlands. He died in York, Maine.

He wrote four symphonies (1926, 1930, 1936 and 1946) and other orchestral, vocal, and chamber music in a broadly neoclassical style.

His second symphony was one of the few American works Arturo Toscanini performed with the New York Philharmonic Orchestra; the first performances were on November 10, 11, and 13, 1933, in Carnegie Hall.

References

1894 births
1971 deaths
20th-century classical composers
Dutch male classical composers
Dutch classical composers
American male classical composers
American classical composers
Juilliard School faculty
People from Arnhem
Utrecht University alumni
Dutch emigrants to the United States
Officers of the Order of Orange-Nassau
20th-century American composers
20th-century American male musicians